Wolfram Müller (born 8 July 1981 in Pirna) is a German middle-distance runner who specialises in the 1500 metres.

He became European junior 5000 metres champion in 1999. In his special distance he won the silver medal at the 2000 World Junior Championships and finished seventh at the 2005 European Indoor Championships. He also competed at the 2001 World Championships and the 2004 Olympic Games without reaching the finals.

His personal best time is 3:35.50 minutes, achieved in June 2003 in Milan.

He has competed for the athletics clubs LAV Tübingen and LSV Pirna.

References 
 

1981 births
Living people
People from Pirna
People from Bezirk Dresden
German male middle-distance runners
Sportspeople from Saxony
Olympic athletes of Germany
Athletes (track and field) at the 2004 Summer Olympics
German national athletics champions